Simpsonichthys delucai is a species of killifish from the family Rivulidae.
It is found in Brazil in South America. 

Etymology
The fish is named in honor of Andre C. De Luca of the Federal University of Rio de Janeiro, who was the first collector of this species.

References

delucai
Taxa named by Wilson José Eduardo Moreira da Costa
Fish described in 2003
Freshwater fish of Brazil